The following television stations broadcast on digital channel 20 in Mexico:

 XHCHD-TDT in Ciudad Delicias, Chihuahua
 XHCHU-TDT in Ciudad Cuauhtémoc, Chihuahua
 XHCIP-TDT in Cuernavaca, Morelos
 XHCK-TDT in Chilpancingo, Guerrero
 XHCTCA-TDT in Campeche, Campeche
 XHCTJA-TDT in Xalapa, Veracruz
 XHCTVI-TDT in Ciudad Victoria, Tamaulipas
 XHCVP-TDT in Coatzacoalcos, Veracruz
 XHENT-TDT in Ensenada, Baja California 
 XHGEM-TDT in Toluca, State of Mexico
 XHGST-TDT in Guaymas, Sonora
 XHILA-TDT in Mexicali, Baja California
 XHJBT-TDT in San Juan Bautista Tuxtepec, Oaxaca
 XHO-TDT in Torreón, Coahuila
 XHPBCN-TDT in Cancún, Quintana Roo
 XHPN-TDT in Piedras Negras, Coahuila
 XHSPA-TDT in Sahuaripa, Sonora
 XHSPRCE-TDT in Celaya, Guanajuato
 XHSPRGA-TDT in Guadalajara, Jalisco
 XHSTC-TDT in Saltillo, Coahuila
 XHTMCH-TDT in Chetumal, Quintana Roo
 XHTMNL-TDT in Agualeguas, Nuevo León
 XHTTG-TDT in the state of Chiapas
 XHUNAM-TDT in Mexico City
 XHZAC-TDT in Zacatecas, Zacatecas
 XHZAP-TDT in Zacatlán, Puebla 

20